Greatest Hits is the second greatest hits album by Danish-Norwegian pop band Aqua. The album was released on June 15, 2009, on Universal. Although it is their second greatest hits album, it is the first one to be released internationally, with Cartoon Heroes: The Best of Aqua (2002) only being released in Japan. The compilation was not released on any physical or digital format in North America. Greatest Hits includes digitally remastered versions of sixteen songs from Aqua's two previous studio albums, Aquarium (1997) and Aquarius (2000), and three new songs: "Back to the 80s", "My Mamma Said", and "Live Fast – Die Young". "Back to the 80s" was released as the album's lead single on May 25, 2009.

A Special Edition re-issue was released in Denmark on November 16, 2009. It includes a new song, "Spin Me a Christmas", and replaces "Be a Man" with "Good Morning Sunshine". It also includes a DVD with a live recording of Aqua at Tivoli in Copenhagen, recorded on August 7, 2009. The DVD track listing features the unreleased song "Shakin' Stevens (Is a Superstar)", which supposedly were written for the band's third studio album before their split in July 2001. The song was re-written as "Sucker For a Superstar" for the band's third studio album, Megalomania (2011).

The album peaked at number one in Denmark and therefore was released in the rest of Europe on September 22, 2009, but without repeating the same success.

Commercial performance
On the chart dated June 26, 2009 the album debuted at number one in Denmark, where it stayed for two weeks. In its third week on the chart the album fell to number two, and stayed there for six weeks before reaching number one on the chart dated August 21, 2009. The album stayed in the top 40 for thirty-nine weeks. In December 2009 the album was certified two-times platinum by the International Federation of the Phonographic Industry (IFPI) for shipments of 60,000 copies in Denmark.

Singles
"Back to the 80's" was released digitally as the lead single of the album on May 25, 2009. It is Aqua's first single in eight years. On May 25, it premiered on the Danish radio channel Radio 100FM. The song reached number one in Denmark, knocking the 2009 Eurovision Song Contest winner Alexander Rybak's song "Fairytale" off the top spot for five weeks. "My Mamma Said" was released as the second single from the album in November 2009. Previously, the song had already reached number 11 on the Danish Singles Chart due to strong digital sales from the album. The new song made for the Special Edition re-release, "Spin Me a Christmas", was released as the album's third single on November 16, 2009.

Even though "Live Fast – Die Young" was not released as an official single, it peaked at number twenty-four on the Danish Singles Chart due to strong digital sales from the album.

Track listings

Charts

Charts

Certifications

Release history

References

2009 greatest hits albums
Aqua (band) compilation albums